The Recursive Porous Agent Simulation Toolkit (Repast) is a widely used free and open-source, cross-platform, agent-based modeling and simulation toolkit. Repast has multiple implementations in several languages  and built-in adaptive features, such as genetic algorithms and regression. 

Repast was originally developed by David Sallach, Nick Collier, Tom Howe, Michael North and others at the University of Chicago.

Features
 variety of agents and examples
 fully object oriented
 fully concurrent discrete event scheduler 
 built-in simulation results logging and graphing tools 
 allows users to dynamically access and modify agents and model at run time
 libraries for genetic algorithms, neural networks, etc.
 built-in systems dynamics modeling
 social network modeling tools
 integrated geographical information systems (GIS) support
 implemented in Java, C#, etc.
 supports Java, C#, Managed C++, Visual Basic.Net, Managed Lisp, Managed Prolog, and Python scripting, etc.
 is available on virtually all modern computing platforms

See also
Agent-based social simulation
NetLogo
Sugarscape
Swarm

References
"Agent'97 Repast", agent2002.anl.gov.

External links
Repast homepage
Repast Self-Study Guide

Agent-based software